Thomas Mensah may refer to:

 Thomas Mensah (engineer), Ghanaian-American chemical engineer and inventor
 Thomas Mensah (lawyer) (1932–2020), Ghanaian lawyer, judge and diplomat
 Thomas Kwaku Mensah (1935–2016), Roman Catholic archbishop